Kevin John Serrapede (born August 4, 1948) is an American former handball player who competed in the 1972 Summer Olympics and in the 1976 Summer Olympics.

He was born in Queens, New York City.

In 1972 he was part of the American team which finished 14th in the Olympic tournament. He played four matches and scored three goals.

Four years later he finished tenth with the American team in the 1976 Olympic tournament. He played all five matches and scored four goals.

He played for the Adelphi University.

References

External links
 profile

1948 births
Living people
American male handball players
Olympic handball players of the United States
Handball players at the 1972 Summer Olympics
Handball players at the 1976 Summer Olympics
Sportspeople from Queens, New York